Forlì is a comune (municipality) and city in Emilia-Romagna, Northern Italy, and is the capital of the province of Forlì-Cesena. It is the central city of Romagna.

The city is situated along the Via Emilia, to the east of the Montone river, and is an important agricultural centre. The city hosts some of Italy's culturally and artistically significant landmarks; it is also notable as the birthplace of painters Melozzo da Forlì and Marco Palmezzano, humanist historian Flavio Biondo, physicians Geronimo Mercuriali and Giovanni Battista Morgagni. The University Campus of Forlì (part of the University of Bologna) is specialized in Economics, Engineering, Political Sciences as well as the Advanced school of Modern Languages for Interpreters and Translators (SSLMIT).

Climate 
The climate of the area is humid subtropical (Cfa in the Köppen climate classification) with Mediterranean features, fairly mitigated by the relative closeness of the city to the sea.

Forlì is characterized by hot and sunny summers, with temperatures that can exceed  and even reach  during the hottest weeks of the year.

Winters are cool and moist, with frequent fog. Occasionally the warm Sirocco wind blows from the south, bringing warmer temperatures for brief periods.

History

Ancient era 
The surroundings of Forlì have been inhabited since the Paleolithic: a site, Ca' Belvedere of Monte Poggiolo, has revealed thousands of chipped flints in strata dated 800,000 years before the present era, which indicates a flint-knapping industry producing sharp-edged tools in a pre-Acheulean phase of the Paleolithic.

Forlì was founded after the Roman conquest of the remaining Gallic villages, about the time the Via Aemilia was built. With no clear evidence, the exact date this occurred is still under debate, though some historians believe that the first settlement of the ancient Roman Forum was built in approximately 188 BC by consul Gaius Livius Salinator (the same that fought Hasdrubal Barca and vanquished him at the banks of the Metaurus River in 207 BC), who gave it the Latin name Forum Livii, meaning "the place of the gens Livia". Others argue the town may have been founded later, during the time of Julius Caesar. In 88 BC, the city was destroyed during the civil wars of Gaius Marius and Sulla, but later rebuilt by the praetor Livius Clodius.

Middle Ages 
After the collapse of the Western Roman Empire, the city was incorporated into the realms of Odoacer and of the Ostrogothic Kingdom. From the end of the 6th century to 751, Forlì was an outlying part of the Byzantine / Eastern Roman power in Italy known as the Exarchate of Ravenna. During this time the Germanic Lombards repeatedly took the city – in 665, 728, and 742. It was finally incorporated with the Papal States in 757, as part of the Donation of Pepin.

By the 9th century the commune had taken control from its bishops, and Forlì was established as an independent Italian city-state, alongside the other communes that signalled the first revival of urban life in Italy. Forlì became a republic for the first time in 889. At this time the city was allied with the Ghibelline factions in the medieval struggles between the Guelphs and Ghibellines, partly as a means of preserving its independence – and the city supported all the Holy Roman Emperors in their campaigns in Italy.

Local competition was involved in the loyalties: in 1241, during Frederick II's struggles with Pope Gregory IX the people of Forlì offered their support to Frederick II during the capture of the rival city, Faenza, and in gratitude, they were granted an addition to their coat-of-arms -the Hohenstaufen eagle.

With the collapse of Hohenstaufen power in 1257, imperial lieutenant Guido I da Montefeltro was forced to take refuge in Forlì, the only remaining Ghibelline stronghold in Italy. He accepted the position of capitano del popolo ("Captain of the People") and led Forlì to notable victories: against the Bolognesi at the Ponte di San Proculo, on 15 June 1275; against a Guelph allied force, including Florentine troops, at Civitella on 14 November 1276; and at Forlì itself against a powerful French contingent sent by Pope Martin IV, on 15 May 1282, in a battle cited by Dante Alighieri (who was hosted in the city in 1303 by Scarpetta Ordelaffi), Inferno 27. In 1282, Forlì's forces were led by Guido da Montefeltro, while the French were under Jean d'Eppe. The astrologer Guido Bonatti (advisor of Emperor Frederick II) was one of his advisors.

The following year the city's exhausted Senate was forced to cede to papal power and asked Guido to take his leave. The commune soon submitted to a local condottiere rather than accept a representative of direct papal control, and Simone Mestaguerra had himself proclaimed Lord of Forlì. He did not succeed in leaving the new signory peacefully to an heir, however, and Forlì passed to Maghinardo Pagano, then to Uguccione della Faggiuola (1297), and to others, until in 1302 the Ordelaffi came into power.

Local factions with papal support ousted the family in 1327–29 and again in 1359–75, and at other turns of events the bishops were expelled by the Ordelaffi. Until the Renaissance the Ordelaffi strived to maintain the possession of the city and its countryside, especially against Papal attempts to assert back their authority. Often civil wars between members of the family occurred. They also fought as condottieri for other states to earn themselves money to protect or embellish Forlì.

Modern age 
The most renowned of the Ordelaffi was Pino III, who held the Signiory of Forlì from 1466 to 1480. Pino was a ruthless lord; nevertheless he enriched the city with new walls and buildings and was a sponsor of the arts. When he died aged 40, under suspicion of poisoning, the situation of Forlì was weakened as factions of Ordelaffi fought one another, until Pope Sixtus IV claimed the signory for his nephew Girolamo Riario. Riario was married to Caterina Sforza, the indomitable Lady of Forlì whose name is associated with the city's last independent history. Forlì was seized in 1488 by the Visconti and in 1499 by Cesare Borgia, after whose death it became more directly subject to the pope than ever before (apart from a short-lived return of the Ordelaffi in 1503–1504).

In June 1796, during the French Revolution, Jacobin French troops entered the city — with Napoleon arriving on 4 February 1797. The French General recruited local officials and soldiers, resulting in political turmoil between 1820 and 1830, with risings in 1821 —including the revolutionary movement of the Carbonari in 1831 and 1848. Napoléon Louis Bonaparte, Napoleon I's nephew who was involved with the Carbonari, died there in 1831.

In the 19th century, Forlì was part of the Italian unification (or "the Risorgimento"), a political and social movement that agglomerated the different states of the Italian Peninsula into the single state of Italy. The citizens of Forlì were particularly inspired by military figure Giuseppe Garibaldi, who at this time was a commander. However, the city and its farmers had difficulty adapting to agrarian reform under the unification, thus lending rise to republican and socialist parties.

Forlì participated considerably during World War I, resulting in it being awarded the "" gold medal. Afterwards in the 1920s, Benito Mussolini became actively involved in the local politics, before becoming dictator of Italy — a situation that remained for 20 years before the start of World War II. After the war, however, the city experienced a quick economic recovery, entering a new stage of democratic life.

Economy 
Forlì is a prosperous agricultural and industrial centre, with manufacture primarily focused on silk, rayon, clothing, machinery, metals, and household appliances. In the city also has seat the Ferretti Group, one of the most famous producers of yachts.

Government

Main sights 

Forlì is the location of various buildings of architectural, artistic and historical significance, that include frescoes as part of their decorations. At the heart of the city sits the Piazza Aurelio Saffi, which includes a statue of Italian politician Aurelio Saffi – who was an important figure in the radical republican current within the Risorgimento movement, headed by Giuseppe Mazzini in the 19th century. The Piazza Saffi also includes the Abbey of San Mercuriale (named after Saint Mercurialis, a bishop of the city who died in the 5th century), which is the main religious building in the city; and contains the famed Sepulchre of Barbara Manfredi. Also of note is the Dominican Church of San Giacomo Apostolo; better known as the Church of San Domenico – a late medieval church built in the 13th century in the southern part of the town.

Other medieval buildings include the Rocca di Ravaldino, a fortress enlarged in the 14th century by the Ordelaffi and Gil de Albornoz, and later in the 15th century.

The city hosts the Palazzo Hercolani, with decorations dating from the 19th century; containing the artwork La Beata Vergine del Fuoco con i Santi Mercuriale, Pellegrino, Marcolino e Valeriano by Italian painter . The  is a civic building which was frescoed by Adolfo de Carolis in the 20th century.

Forlì has parks located in green areas, including the Parco della Resistenza ("Resistance Park") city park, and the Parco di Via Dragoni – which provides performance facilities alongside standard amenities. The Teatro Diego Fabbri is a theatre which opened in September 2000.

People 

The most well-known painter of the comune was Melozzo da Forlì, who worked in Rome and other Italian cities during the brief years of the High Renaissance. Other Forlivese painters were: Ansuino da Forlì, Marco Palmezzano, Francesco Menzocchi, and Livio Agresti. Together, they formed the Forlì painting school. Carlo Cignani was not born in Forlì (but near Forlì), but painted important works there.

Other notable Forlivese people are:
Alice, Italian singer, winner of Sanremo Festival
Marco Sabiu, musician and composer
Ercole Baldini
Ilario Bandini, constructor of performance sports and race cars
Pietro Bandini, missionary who worked with Italian American immigrants
Flavio Biondo, Renaissance historian
Giovanni Battista Cirri, cellist and composer in the 18th century
Ignazio Cirri, organist and composer in the 18th century
Alessandro Cortini, one-half of Modwheelmood and keyboard player in Nine Inch Nails
Maria Farneti, opera singer
Alessandro Franceschi, Bishop of Forlì (1594–1597)
Peregrino Laziosi 
Cesare Hercolani
Saint Peregrine Laziosi
Gino Mattarelli, politician
Geronimo Mercuriali
Matteo Montaguti, cyclist
Giovanni Battista Morgagni
Loris Reggiani, motorcycle road racer
Girolamo Riario
Aurelio Saffi
Caterina Sforza
Giulietta Simionato, operatic mezzo-soprano, 1910–2010
Nicola Bombacci, Italian Communist who later allied with Benito Mussolini

Territorial subdivisions 
Forlì is divided into territorial subdivisions, or frazione.

Villafranca di Forlì 

Villafranca di Forlì is a hamlet which a dependency of the municipality of Forlì, located on the north side of the main town, and spans over a territory sided on the west side by the River Montone. The hamlet was the birthplace of Benito Mussolini's mother, Rosa.

It is the seat of the Flight School Ali Soccorso belonging to the Civil Defence.

This recreational aerodrome is complementary to Forlì's main airport, south of the city.

Other frazioni

Transport 
Forlì railway station is on the Bologna–Ancona line. Opened for use in 1926, it replaced the original station, which had been in use since 1861.

Forlì Airport was closed on 29 March 2013 due to bankruptcy of the company that ran it. After 8 years in March 2021 the airport start functioning again.

Twin towns 

Forlì is twinned with:

 Aveiro, Portugal
 Bourges, France
 Peterborough, United Kingdom
 Szolnok, Hungary
 Płock, Poland

In popular culture 
 Somerset Maugham's second novel The Making of a Saint (1898) is set in late fifteenth century Forlì under Girolamo Riario.
 The city is featured in the 2009 video game Assassin's Creed II, where Ezio Auditore has to defend it against the Orsi brothers with Machiavelli and Caterina Sforza. Forlì is shown with prominent landmarks.

References

Further reading

External links 

 Forlì, Italia.it
 The Forlì Campus of the University of Bologna
 Almanacco di Forlì, an almanac of the most important events and chronicles of Forlì
 4Live!: 4Live! Basket Team Forlì
 

 
Cities and towns in Emilia-Romagna
Cities founded by Rome
Papal States